John F. O'Malley (1885 – ) was an American architect from Rhode Island.

Life and career
John F. O'Malley was born in 1885. His training is unknown, but he opened his office at 75 Westminster Street in Providence around 1910. In 1915 he was briefly associated with Harry A. Lewis, who would later open an office in the same building. In 1919, he moved his office to Pawtucket's Fanning Building, which he had designed several years prior. At this time he also moved his family to Central Falls. From 1923 until 1931, he was associated with Frank E. Fitzsimmons in the firm of the O'Malley-Fitzsimmons Company. From then until the end of his career, O'Malley practiced alone. He died circa 1950.

As a major associate of Pawtucket mayor Thomas P. McCoy, O'Malley designed many of Pawtucket's civic buildings of the 1930s, including City Hall. Several of his later works are listed on the U.S. National Register of Historic Places.

Architectural works

John F. O'Falley, c.1910-1923
 1910 - Thomas A. O'Gorman Duplexes, 400-402 and 404-408 Lloyd Ave, Providence, Rhode Island
 1913 - Sherbrook Apartments, 103-107 Broadway, Providence, Rhode Island
 Demolished.
 1914 - The Elmgrove, 152 Elmgrove Ave, Providence, Rhode Island
 1914 - Fanning Building, 84 Broad St, Pawtucket, Rhode Island
 Demolished.
 1914 - Mrs. Allen Russell House, 36 Whitford Ave, Providence, Rhode Island
 1914 - St. Brigid R. C. Church, 1231 Plainfield St, Thornton, Rhode Island
 1915 - Casino, Rhodes-on-the Pawtuxet, 60 Rhodes Pl, Cranston, Rhode Island
 In association with Harry A. Lewis.
 1915 - Thomas F. Moran House, 317-319 Wayland Ave, Providence, Rhode Island
 1915 - John J. Rosenfeld House, 437 Rochambeau Ave, Providence, Rhode Island
 1915 - Albert E. Schiller Building, 466 Broad St, Central Falls, Rhode Island
 1915 - Shea's Theatre, 334 Broad St, Valley Falls, Rhode Island
 Demolished.
 1915 - St. Anthony R. C. School, 240 Laban St, Providence, Rhode Island
 1915 - St. Francis Xavier R. C. Church, 81 N Carpenter St, East Providence, Rhode Island
 1915 - St. Joseph R. C. Church, 391 High St, Central Falls, Rhode Island
 1916 - Edward J. McCaughey House, 51 Arlington St, Pawtucket, Rhode Island
 1916 - St. Ann R. C. School, 525 Branch Ave, Providence, Rhode Island
 Demolished.
 1919 - Lincoln Memorial School (former), 1624 Lonsdale Ave, Lonsdale, Rhode Island
 1921 - Leroy Theatre, 66 Broad St, Pawtucket, Rhode Island
 Demolished in 1996.
 1922 - St. Edward R. C. School, 61 Hope St, Pawtucket, Rhode Island
 1923 - Pearlman Apartments, 150-154 Camp St, Providence, Rhode Island

O'Malley-Fitzsimmons Company, 1923-1931
 1925 - McCormick Apartments, 213 Walcott St, Pawtucket, Rhode Island
 1925 - Our Lady of Mt. Carmel R. C. Church, 12 Spruce St, Providence, Rhode Island
 1926 - Elks Building, 27 Exchange St, Pawtucket, Rhode Island
 1929 - Rectory for Holy Name R. C. Church, 99 Camp St, Providence, Rhode Island

John F. O'Malley, after 1931
 1931 - Fergus J. McOsker House, 612 Elmgrove Ave, Providence, Rhode Island
 1933 - Pawtucket City Hall, 137 Roosevelt Ave, Pawtucket, Rhode Island
 With William G. Richards of Providence.
 1937 - Pawtucket West High School, 485 East Ave, Pawtucket, Rhode Island
 1939 - Holy Name R. C. School, 55 Locust St, Providence, Rhode Island
 1940 - Prospect Heights, 560 Prospect St, Pawtucket, Rhode Island

References

American architects
Architects from Pawtucket, Rhode Island
Architects from Providence, Rhode Island
1885 births
Year of death missing